Erika de la Rosa (born September 26, 1980, Ciudad Juarez, Chihuahua, Mexico), is a Mexican actress and model.

Filmography

Theatre 
 2010: Cinco mujeres usando el mismo vestido
 2016: El Beso del Jabali de Eduardo H.Roman

References

External links

1982 births
Living people
Mexican telenovela actresses
Mexican television actresses
Mexican film actresses
21st-century Mexican actresses
Actresses from Chihuahua (state)
People from Ciudad Juárez